This list covers television programs whose first letter (excluding "the") of the title are I and J.

I

IA
I (Almost) Got Away with It
I Am Cait
I Am Frankie
I Am Weasel

IC
I Can Do That
I Can See Your Voice
 I Can See Your Voice (South Korea)
I Can See Your Voice (US)
iCarly (2007)
iCarly (2021)
Ice
Ice & Coco
Ice Fantasy
Ice Loves Coco
Ice Road Truckers
Ichabod and Me

ID
I'd Do Anything (UK)
I Didn't Do It
Idiotest
The Idolmaster Cinderella Girls
I Dream of Jeannie
I Dream of NeNe: The Wedding

IF
I Feel Bad
If Loving You Is Wrong

IG
I Got a Rocket

IL
I Love Lucy
I Love Money
I Love New York
The Iliza Shlesinger Sketch Show

IM
I'm a Celebrity...Get Me Out of Here! (UK)
I'm a Celebrity...Get Me Out of Here! (US)
I'm Alan Partridge
I'm an Animal
I'm In The Band
The Immortal
Impact!
Impact! Xplosion
Impastor
Imposters
Impractical Jokers (US)
Impractical Jokers UK
I'm Telling!
I'm with Her
Imagination Movers

IN
The InBetween
The Inbetweeners (UK)
The Inbetweeners (US)
Inch High, Private Eye
Income Property
Incorporated
 Incredible Crew
The Incredible Hulk
Indebted
Infinity Train
The Ingraham Angle
Inhumanoids
Inhumans
Ink Master
Inquizition
In the Dark
In the House
In Living Color
In Plain Sight
In Real Life
Insane Coaster Wars
Insatiable
In Search of...
The Inside
Inside the Actors Studio
Inside Dish
Inside Edition
Inside Politics
Inside Washington
The Insider
The Inspector Alleyn Mysteries (British)
Inspector Gadget (1983)
Inspector Gadget (2015)
Instant Mom
Instant Star
The Inspector Lynley Mysteries (UK)
Interior Therapy with Jeff Lewis
The Interns
Interpol Calling
Intervention
Intimate Portrait
In the Heat of the Night
In the Night Garden...
In Treatment
InuYasha
Invader Zim
The Invaders
The Investigators (1961)

IP
I Pity the Fool

IR
Iron Chef (Japan)
Iron Chef America
Iron Chef Australia
Iron Chef Gauntlet
Iron Chef Showdown
Iron Chef UK
Iron Chef USA
Iron Chef Vietnam
Iron Fist
Iron Kid
Iron Man
Iron Man: Armored Adventures
Ironside (1967)
Ironside (2013)

IS
The Isiah Factor Uncensored
I Shouldn't Be Alive
I Spy (1955)
I Spy (1965)
I Spy (2002)
The Islanders

IT
The IT Crowd
It Takes a Thief (1968)
It Takes a Thief (2005)
It's About Time
It's All About Amy (UK)
It's All in the Game
It's Always Jan
It's Always Sunny in Philadelphia
It's a Brad, Brad World
It's Garry Shandling's Show
It's a Knockout
It's a Living (Canada)
It's a Living (US)
It's a Miracle
It's Not You, It's Men
It's Punky Brewster
It's a Square World
It's Worth What?
It's Your Call with Lynn Doyle

IV
Ivanhoe (1958)
Ivanhoe (1970)
I've Got a Secret
Ivor the Engine (UK)

IW
I Wanna Be a Soap Star

IY
Iyanla: Fix My Life

IZ
iZombie

J

JA
Jabberjaw
Jabu's Jungle
Jackass
Jacob Two-Two
The Jack Benny Program
Jack's Big Music Show
Jack & Bobby
Jack Hanna's Animal Adventures
Jack Hanna's Into the Wild
Jack Ryan
Jackie Chan Adventures
The Jackie Gleason Show
Jack of All Trades
The Jack Paar Program
Jack the Ripper (UK)
Jackanory
Jackpot
The Jacksons: Next Generation
JAG
Jagger Eaton's Mega Life
Jail
Jake 2.0
Jake and the Fatman
Jake and the Never Land Pirates
Jakers! The Adventures of Piggley Winks
James at 15 (later James at 16)
James Bond Jr.
Jamie and the Magic Torch
The Jamie Foxx Show
Ja'mie: Private School Girl
Jana of the Jungle
Jane and the Dragon
Jane By Design
Jane Velez-Mitchell
Jane the Virgin
The Janice Dickinson Modeling Agency
 Jason King (UK)
 Jason of Star Command
 Jayce and the Wheeled Warriors
The Jay Leno Show
Jay Leno's Garage

JE
The Jeannie Carson Show
The Jeffersons
Jellystone!
Jem
Jenny
The Jenny McCarthy Show (1997)
The Jenny McCarthy Show (2013)
Jeopardy!
Jep!
Jeremiah
Jericho
Jerry Lewis MDA Telethon
The Jerry Springer Show
The Jersey
Jerseylicious
Jersey Shore
Jersey Shore: Family Vacation
Jesse
Jessica Jones
Jessie (1984)
Jessie (2011)
The Jetsons

JI
Jim Henson's Animal Show
Jim Henson's Creature Shop Challenge
Jim Henson's Mother Goose Stories
Jim Henson's Pajanimals
Jimbo and the Jet-Set (UK)
The Jimmie Rodgers Show
The Jimmy Dean Show
Jimmy Kimmel Live!
Jimmy Neutron
The Jimmy Stewart Show
Jimmy Two-Shoes
The Jim Nabors Hour
The Jinx

JO
Jo (France)
Joan of Arcadia
Joanie Loves Chachi
Joe 90 (UK)
Joe Millionaire
Joe Pera Talks With You
The Joe Schmo Show
Joey
John Adams
John McLaughlin's One On One
Johnny and the Sprites
Johnny Bravo
The Johnny Cash Show
Johnny Staccato
Johnny Test
Joint Account (UK)
JoJo's Circus
The Joker's Wild
Joking Apart
Jonas
Jonas Brothers: Living the Dream
Jonathan Creek
Jonny Briggs
Jonny Quest
Joshua Jones
Josie and the Pussycats
The Journey of Allen Strange
Journeyman
Jo Frost: Nanny On Tour
Joy Behar: Say Anything!
The Joy of Painting

JU
Jubilee USA
Judd, for the Defense
The Judds
Judge Joe Brown
Judge John Deed
Judge Judy
Judge Mathis
Judging Amy
Juke Box Jury
Juken Sentai Gekiranger
Julia (1968)
Julia (2022)
Julie
Juliet Bravo (British)
Julius Jr.
The Jump (British)
The Jungle Book
The Jungle Bunch
Jungle Cubs
Jungle Junction
Junior Bake Off (UK)
Junior Television Club
Junkyard Wars
Jurassic World Camp Cretaceous
The Jury
Just Beyond
Just Good Friends (UK)
Just for Laughs
Just for Laughs Gags
Just Jordan
Just Kidding
Justice (1971)
Justice (2006)
Justice League
Justice League Unlimited
Justin Time
Justified
Just In
Just Roll With It
Just Shoot Me!
Just the Ten of Us
Just William (1976)
Just William (1994)
Justice League Action
Julie's Greenroom
Jumanji
Previous:  List of television programs: H    Next:  List of television programs: K-L